Dhondup Gyal (1953–1985) is considered the first modern Tibetan poet breaking through traditional Tibetan formalist elements. He is widely regarded in Tibet as the founder of Modern Tibetan Poetry. An accomplished scholar, writer, poet and patriot, he committed suicide in 1985 when he was only 32.

Besides poetry he wrote many short stories. One short story "Trulku" was criticized for its portrayal of a charlatan lama who goes onto have relationship with two women, this caused a furore in the conservative Tibetan community in Tibet. A compilation of his short stories and poetry was published Amnye Machen, his works are also available in translated form.

Dhondup Gyal, is the first Tibetan poet to have written his poems in free verse in Waterfall of Youth (Lang tsho’i rbab chu), influencing a generation in Tibet, including Namlo Yak.

References

1985 deaths
1953 births
Tibetan poets
1985 suicides
Suicides by asphyxiation
Suicides in the People's Republic of China